In fluid dynamics, momentum theory or disk actuator theory is a theory describing a mathematical model of an ideal actuator disk, such as a propeller or helicopter rotor, by W.J.M. Rankine (1865), Alfred George Greenhill (1888) and  (1889).

The rotor is modeled as an infinitely thin disc, inducing a constant velocity along the axis of rotation. The basic state of a helicopter is hovering. This disc creates a flow around the rotor. Under certain mathematical premises of the fluid, there can be extracted a mathematical connection between power, radius of the rotor, torque and induced velocity. Friction is not included.

For a stationary open rotor with no outer duct, such as a helicopter in hover, the power required to produce a given thrust is:

where:
 T is the thrust
  is the density of air (or other medium)
 A is the area of the rotor disc
 P is power

A device which converts the translational energy of the fluid into rotational energy of the axis or vice versa is called a Rankine disk actuator. The real life implementations of such devices include marine and aviation propellers, windmills, helicopter rotors, centrifugal pumps, wind turbines, turbochargers and chemical agitators.

See also
 Blade element theory
 Circulation (fluid dynamics)
 Disk loading
 Kutta–Joukowski theorem

External links

  Momentum theory (Froude)

Fluid dynamics
Propellers
Momentum